"Express" is an 1974 instrumental written and performed by B. T. Express. It features the sounds of train whistles, which are heard in several sections of the instrumental track. Only the words: "Here comes the Express/ The Express/ Chug, Chug, Chug, Chug, Chug, UGH"/ are said.

Chart performance
"Express" reached No. 4 on the US pop chart, No. 1 on the US R&B chart, and No. 1 on the US dance chart. Outside the US, the song peaked at No. 34 on the UK Singles Chart and a remix of it made No. 67 in the UK in 1994.

See also
 List of number-one dance singles of 1974 (U.S.)

References

1974 singles
1975 singles
1970s instrumentals
Pop instrumentals
B. T. Express songs
1974 songs
Scepter Records singles
Pete Waterman Entertainment singles